The Joburg Ladies Open is a women's professional golf tournament held in Johannesburg, South Africa. It is an event on the Southern Africa-based Sunshine Ladies Tour since 2015 and starting in 2022 co-sanctioned with the Ladies European Tour. 

It was played at the Royal Johannesburg & Kensington Golf Club until 2017. It moved to Modderfontein in 2018 and on to the refurbished Soweto Country Club for the following three years.

Winners

See also
Joburg Open

References

External links
Coverage on the Sunshine Tour's official site

Ladies European Tour events
Sunshine Ladies Tour events
Golf tournaments in South Africa
Sports competitions in Johannesburg